Mitochondrial glycine transporter is a protein that in humans is encoded by the SLC25A38 gene. SLC25A38 is involved in mitochondrial handling of glycine and is needed for the first step in heme synthesis. Mutations in this gene can lead to an autosomal recessive form of sideroblastic anemia.

References

Solute carrier family